Jawdat Jabra (born 5 August 1948) is a Syrian wrestler. He competed in the men's Greco-Roman +100 kg at the 1980 Summer Olympics.

References

External links
 

1948 births
Living people
Syrian male sport wrestlers
Olympic wrestlers of Syria
Wrestlers at the 1980 Summer Olympics
Place of birth missing (living people)
20th-century Syrian people